Ludwig Wrede (28 October 1894 – 1 January 1965) was an Austrian figure skater in both pairs and singles skating.

He competed with Herma Szabo and won the World Championships in 1925 and 1927. They won the bronze in 1926. After Szabo retired, Wrede competed with Melitta Brunner, with whom he won the bronze medal at the 1928 Winter Olympics. The pair won two silvers and a bronze at the World Championships from 1928 through 1930. As a singles skater, Wrede won the silver medal at the European Championships in 1924 and a bronze in 1929, besides a bronze in the World Championships in 1929.

Results

Singles

Pairs with Brunner

Pairs with Szabo

References

1894 births
1965 deaths
Austrian male pair skaters
Austrian male single skaters
Figure skaters at the 1928 Winter Olympics
Olympic figure skaters of Austria
Olympic bronze medalists for Austria
Olympic medalists in figure skating
World Figure Skating Championships medalists
European Figure Skating Championships medalists
Medalists at the 1928 Winter Olympics